Juscelinomys is a genus of burrowing mice. The name is derived from  Brazilian president Juscelino Kubitschek who created the city of Brasilia where the Brasilia burrowing mouse was discovered. 

There are two living species:
 †J. candango Candango mouse
 J. guaporensis Rio Guaporé mouse
 J. huanchacae Huanchaca mouse

A fourth species, J. talpinus, is known only from subfossil remains.  Some authorities treat it as a distinct species or a senior synonym for one or all species in Juscelinomys.

References

 
Rodent genera